Bridget Hustwaite (born 10 April 1991) is an Australian radio presenter, television presenter, journalist, author, and health activist.

Her debut book, How to Endo, which chronicles her experiences with endometriosis, was released on 2 March 2021.

Early life and education
Bridget Hustwaite was born in 
Ballarat, Victoria on 10 April 1991. Hustwaite grew up in Ballarat and in nearby Learmonth. She graduated from Ballarat High School in 2008, and then studied visual merchandising at the Swinburne University of Technology.

Personal life
Hustwaite resides in Melbourne,
Victoria. From 2016 to April 2021, Hustwaite was in a relationship with Matt Jennings. She now dates professional footballer Oscar McDonald.

Health issues
Hustwaite was diagnosed with stage four endometriosis on 16 August 2018, following six years of suffering intense abdominal pain, nausea, and fatigue during her adolescent menstrual years. Speaking shortly after the diagnosis, Hustwaite stated: "We need faster diagnosis, better treatments and more education and awareness about endometriosis. The fact [that] this research is being funded is a step in the right direction." Hustwaite has used heat bags during her shifts on radio in order to minimise pain caused by the condition.

Career
In 2012, Hustwaite was the runner-up in Channel V Australia's Presenter Search. She then began volunteering for music journalism website The AU Review as a concert reviewer, and at SYN Media in Melbourne. With SYN, a youth-run media organisation, Hustwaite presented the live music show 1700, which aired on television through C31 Melbourne. She went on to present radio shows The Hoist and Spotlight on SYN 90.7.

In late 2015, Hustwaite was offered the role of presenter on Triple J's mid-dawn program. She took over from Linda Marigliano as the host of Triple J's weeknight evening show Good Nights in 2018. On 9 May 2019, Hustwaite created an endometriosis-themed Instagram account, titled "Endogram", with the goal of raising awareness, sharing information and encouraging conversations about endometriosis. In early June, memes using puns based on Hustwaite's surname began to circulate on the Facebook group "Sultanaposting". Australian pop culture website Junkee labelled the memes "glorious". Following her endometriosis diagnosis, Hustwaite became an ambassador for Endometriosis Australia on 15 August. During the early stages of the COVID-19 pandemic in Australia in March 2020, she launched "Bridget Hustwaite's Saturday Night Stay In" on Instagram, a series of videos in which she interviewed Australian musicians and hosted a live acoustic performance from them. On 2 March 2021, Hustwaite released her debut book, How to Endo, which chronicles her experiences with her endometriosis diagnosis. On 11 May 2022, she was announced as a jury member for Australia's entry in the Eurovision Song Contest 2022.

Professional work

Filmography

Podcasts

Published works

References

Further reading

External links
 
 
 Profile on The AU Review

1991 births
Australian health activists
Australian women activists
Australian women novelists
Living people
People educated at Ballarat High School
People from Ballarat
Swinburne University of Technology alumni
Triple J announcers
Australian women radio presenters